WFLO is an Adult Contemporary formatted broadcast radio station licensed to Farmville, Virginia, serving Farmville and Prince Edward County, Virginia. WFLO is owned and operated by Heart of Virginia Communications.

On January 2021, Educational Media Foundation agrees to buy Colonial Broadcasting Company's WFLO and WFLO-FM. WFLO end its broadcast as full service on December 31. After the sale EMF convert both radio to K-Love and divest the AM station to Heart of Virginia Communications. WFLO relaunched as "870 WFLO" on December 1.

References

External links
 WFLO-AM Online

1947 establishments in Virginia
Radio stations established in 1947
FLO
FLO
Mainstream adult contemporary radio stations in the United States